Ellen Dunham-Jones (born January 27, 1959) is an architectural educator and urbanist best known for her work on re-educating the public how to interact with their environment. She is also an authority on suburban redevelopment.

Education
Ellen Dunham-Jones studied at Princeton University, graduating with an AB in architecture and planning in 1980 and a Master of Architecture in 1983. She is a registered architect in New York State.

Career
She is a professor in the School of Architecture at Georgia Tech, where she also serves as director of its MS in Urban Design Program in the College of Design.

Work
Dunham-Jones and June Williamson co-authored Retrofitting Suburbia: Urban Design Solutions for Redesigning Suburbs which was awarded the Architecture & Urban Planning category of the 2009 PROSE Award.

Awards and professional leadership
 PROSE Award, 2009 for Professional and Scholarly Excellence from the Association of American Publishers as the 2009 best book of the year in architecture and urban planning.
 Retrofitting Suburbia featured in Time March 23, 2009, cover story
 Fellow of the Congress for the New Urbanism
 #71 on Planetizen's list of the Top 100 Most Influential Urbanists of All Time

In popular culture
Dunham-Jones appeared as herself on the show Adam Ruins Everything.

References

External links
Georgia Tech School of Architecture Profile Page

Living people
American architects
American women architects
New Classical architects
Princeton University School of Architecture alumni
Place of birth missing (living people)
Georgia Tech faculty
Architecture educators
American women academics
21st-century American women
1959 births